Peter Bowers (1930 – 28 June 2010) was an Australian journalist. Bowers was born in Taree, New South Wales. He was offered a cadetship by Frank Packer in 1948, and in 1959 joined The Sydney Morning Herald. He remained with the paper until 1987, working for periods as a political correspondent in the Canberra Press Gallery, as a news editor, as a national affairs columnist, and as a sports reporter. He was awarded a Gold Walkley Award in 1992 for Most Outstanding Contribution to Journalism in the Senior Journalism Section. Bowers died of Alzheimer's disease at a nursing home in Narrabundah in 2010.

References

1930 births
2010 deaths
Australian journalists
Australian reporters and correspondents
People from Taree
The Sydney Morning Herald people